Mac ind Óclaich was the surname of a Gaelic-Irish erenagh and brehon family. They were based in Killary Harbour, between what is now County Mayo and County Galway.

See also

 Aengus Mac ind Oclaich, Archdeacon of Killery, rested in Christ, 1362
 Master Florint Mac in Oclaich died this year, 1366

External links
 http://www.ucc.ie/celt/published/T100011/index.html

Surnames
Irish families
Irish Brehon families
Surnames of Irish origin
Irish-language masculine surnames
Families of Irish ancestry